Vought was the name of several related American aerospace firms. These have included, in the past, Lewis and Vought Corporation, Chance Vought, Vought-Sikorsky, LTV Aerospace (part of Ling-Temco-Vought), Vought Aircraft Companies, and Vought Aircraft Industries.

The first incarnation of Vought was established by Chance M. Vought and Birdseye Lewis in 1917. In 1928, it was acquired by United Aircraft and Transport Corporation, which a few years later became United Aircraft Corporation; this was the first of many reorganizations and buyouts. During the 1920s and 1930s, Vought Aircraft and Chance Vought specialized in carrier-based aircraft for the United States Navy, by far its biggest customer. Chance Vought produced thousands of planes during World War II, including the F4U Corsair.

Vought became independent again in 1954, and was purchased by Ling-Temco-Vought (LTV) in 1961. The company designed and produced a variety of planes and missiles throughout the Cold War. Vought was sold from LTV and owned in various degrees by the Carlyle Group and Northrop Grumman in the early 1990s. It was then fully bought by Carlyle, renamed Vought Aircraft Industries, with headquarters in Dallas, Texas. In June 2010, the Carlyle Group sold Vought to the Triumph Group.

History

Chance Vought years 1917–1928

The Lewis and Vought Corporation was founded in 1917 and was soon succeeded by the Chance Vought Corporation in 1922 when Birdseye Lewis retired. A former chief engineer of the Wright Company, Chance M. Vought, founded the company to take advantage of the growing field of military and civilian aviation after World War I. Operations began in Astoria, New York, and, in 1919, were moved to Long Island City, New York.

Vought died from sepsis in 1930, but in that short time period succeeded in producing a variety of fighters, trainers, flying boats, and surveillance aircraft for the United States Navy and the United States Army Air Service. Vought made history in 1922 when their Vought VE-7 trainer made the first takeoff from the deck of the USS Langley, the first American aircraft carrier. Following this success came the VE-11 naval fighter and the Vought O2U Corsair, the first of the Corsair aircraft.

In 1928, the company was acquired by the United Aircraft and Transport Corporation, but stayed its own separate division among the lines of Pratt & Whitney and Boeing.

1930s–1960

Despite the Great Depression, Vought continued to design and manufacture aircraft at a growing pace. Soon after Chance Vought's death in 1930, the company moved its operations to East Hartford, Connecticut. Under the Air Mail Act of 1934, United Aircraft and Transportation Corp. was forced by law to divide its businesses, resulting in Boeing Aircraft, United Airlines, and the United Aircraft Corp, of which Vought was a part. In 1939, United Aircraft moved Vought to Stratford, Connecticut, where their Sikorsky division was located and renamed the merged divisions Vought-Sikorsky Aircraft.

Chief engineer Rex Beisel began in 1938 to develop the XF4U, recognized by its distinctive inverted gull wings.  After its first flight, in 1940, thousands of F4U Corsairs were produced for the Navy and Marines in World War II.  By the end of its production in 1952, Vought, Goodyear, and Brewster had all produced the Corsair fighters.  Vought was reestablished as a separate division in United Aircraft in 1942.

In postwar 1949, Vought moved operations to Dallas, Texas, where the former North American Aviation "B" plant was located.  Initiated by the Navy, who feared having their two main aircraft manufacturers located on the East Coast posed an unnecessary risk, Vought moved 27 million pounds of equipment and 1300 employees in 14 months, a record breaking industrial move at the time.

In 1954, the company fully separated from United Aircraft and became the independent Chance Vought Aircraft Inc.

Vought began manufacture of its F-8 Crusader for the US Navy in 1957; it was one of the first Navy fighters capable of supersonic flight and the Navy's last all-gun fighter.  The same basic design was later heavily revised and shortened to produce Vought's A-7 Corsair II, a carrier-borne close air support and attack plane in 1965, an aircraft which became heavily engaged in a variety of close support and strike missions during the Vietnam War, beginning in 1967.  The A-7 has also participated in the US invasion of Grenada in 1983; a punitive raid on Syrian missile sites in 1983; reprisal raids against Libya during Operation El Dorado Canyon in 1986; strikes against Iranian coastal platforms and naval forces during Operation Praying Mantis in 1988; support of the 1989 invasion of Panama; and throughout operations during Desert Storm in 1991.  The A-7A, A-7B, A-7C and A-7E served with the US Navy while the A-7D was purchased by the US Air Force and Air National Guard. Two-seat models known as TA-7C/Es served with the US Navy while the US Air Force purchased the TA-7K.   The A-7 served in limited numbers with three foreign air forces, including Greece (A-7H/TA-7H), Portugal (A-7P/TA-7P) and Thailand (ex-USN A-7E/TA-7E).

LTV acquisition 1960–1990

Vought was bought by James Ling in 1962, forming the new conglomerate Ling-Temco-Vought (LTV).  Yet despite the buyout, Vought Aeronautics and Vought Missiles and Space continued to develop and produce for the Air Force and Navy under the umbrella of LTV Aerospace.
By the early 1980s, LTV was struggling, and Vought suffered heavy layoffs.  The first of two decades of reorganizations began in 1972 with the creation of Vought Systems by the merging of the Vought Missiles and Space and Aeronautics divisions.

All of LTV Aerospace was renamed the Vought Corporation in 1976, but by 1983 the Vought company was again split along aeronautic and missile lines under LTV Aerospace and Defense.

1992 proved the end of Vought's relationship with LTV.  In mid-year the aircraft division was purchased by Northrop and the Carlyle Group, each owning roughly 50% of the company. The missile division was sold to the Loral Corporation, part of Lockheed Martin Missiles and Fire Control.

1990s to present

Northrop Grumman, the successor to Northrop and Grumman, bought the Carlyle Group's Vought interest for $130 million in 1994. The purchase by Carlyle Group of the remainder of Northrop Grumman in 2000 would lead to the establishment of Vought Aircraft Industries, Inc. It is primarily an aerostructures subcontractor. Vought is heavily involved in the Boeing 747, Boeing 787 aircraft as well as supplying parts for the F-22 Raptor and F-35 Lightning II and the V-22 Osprey. In July 2003, the Aerostructures Corp., owned by the Carlyle Group and based in Nashville, Tennessee, merged with Vought. Vought's Nashville site supplies wing components for Airbus A319, A320, A330, and A340.

Boeing announced in July 2009 that it had agreed to acquire the North Charleston, South Carolina, facility of Vought Aircraft Industries, where Vought builds sections 47 and 48 of the aft fuselage for Boeing's 787 Dreamliner. Boeing agreed to pay $580 million for the facility.

In June 2010, the Carlyle Group sold Vought to the Triumph Group, an aerospace component manufacturer. The Vought acquisitions now operate as Triumph Aerostructures - Vought Aircraft Division.  The Dallas/Grand Prairie facility was closed and relocated to a new facility in Red Oak, Texas.

Products

Aircraft

Unmanned aerial vehicles
 LTV XQM-93

Missiles
 M270 Multiple Launch Rocket System (1983)
 ASM-135 ASAT (1984)
 MGM-52 Lance (1972)
 SSM-N-8 Regulus (1951)
 SSM-N-9 Regulus II (1956)
 Vought HVM (1980s)

Rockets
Scout (rocket family)
RM-89 Blue Scout I
RM-90 Blue Scout II
Scout X
Scout X-1
Scout X-1A
Scout X-2
Scout X-2B
Scout X-2M

Workshare projects

 Airbus A320 family (upper wing panel assemblies)
 Airbus A330 and A340-200/-300 (mid- and outer-leading edge assemblies, mid-rear spars, center spar assembly, flaps, fairings and upper panel assemblies )
 Airbus A340-500/-600 (mid- and outer-leading edge assemblies, mid-rear spars, center spar assembly, upper panels and stringers)
 Boeing C-17 Globemaster III (ailerons, elevators, and rudders)
 Bell-Boeing V-22 Osprey (empennage, ramp/ramp door)
 Boeing 747 (fuselage panels, tail section)
 Boeing 767 (center wingbox, horizontal stabilizer)
 Boeing 777 (spoilers, flaps)
 Boeing 787 (fuselage barrels—Sections 47 and 48)
 Rockwell B-1B Lancer (aft fuselage and aft intermediate fuselage)
 Lockheed C-5M Super Galaxy (flight control surfaces)
 Lockheed C-130 Hercules (empennage)
 Lockheed Martin F-22 Raptor (stabilator)
 Northrop Grumman B-2 Spirit
 Sikorsky UH-60 Blackhawk/Sikorsky SH-60 Seahawk

References

Notes

Bibliography

External links

 
 Vought Aircraft Industries website's "Heritage" section, with history, photos, and original line drawings of Vought aircraft
 US Centennial of Flight Commission
 LTV/Chance Vought Archive from McDermott Library at the University of Texas at Dallas

 
 
Aircraft manufacturers of the United States
Defense companies of the United States
Manufacturing companies based in South Carolina
Manufacturing companies based in Tennessee
Manufacturing companies established in 1917
1917 establishments in New York (state)
Private equity portfolio companies
The Carlyle Group companies
American companies established in 1917
Technology companies established in 1917